Old House Has Joy (老房有喜) is TV series which was produced in mainland China and Taiwan in 1998. It starred Zhao Wei and Alec Su.

Cast
Zhao Wei starred as Ji Xiang and Li Mei
Alec Su starred as Su Xiao Peng and young Su San
Tian Feng starred as Su San
Chen Min - Li Ming Hua
Zhu Man Feng - Grandma Li
Cao Duo - Su Zhong
Tai Zhi Yuan - Wu You Li

International broadcast

External links

Information and galerry

Mandarin-language television shows
Chinese comedy-drama television series
1998 Chinese television series debuts
1999 Chinese television series endings